Kelly Weekers (born 20 August 1989) is a Dutch TV Host, model and beauty pageant titleholder who won Miss Nederland 2011 and represented the Netherlands at Miss Universe 2011 placed Top 16.

Biography 
Weekers grew up with her sister Romy and parents. During her high school years Kelly worked as a waitress 
where she was scouted multiple times by agencies and started modelling. Weekers proceeded modelling as a part-time job during her high school and college years. Currently Weekers is doing shows, shoots and commercials around the world.

Pageantry 
In April 2011 Kelly became Miss Limburg (the Miss of her province) which automatically made her compete in the grand finale of Miss Netherlands which she won on 10 July 2011. Kelly became Miss Netherlands Universe at an age of 21 years which made her one of the 89 official competitors in the Miss Universe 2011 pageant.
In September of that year she went to Brazil for a full month to compete for the title of Miss Universe 2011. During the grand finale, after 20 years of non-placement, the Netherlands penetrated the Top 16 with Kelly as their ambassador.

After this victory she combined her work as Miss Netherlands Universe with modeling and was traveling around the world. Kelly went from the Five Star Diamond Awards in Cannes to judging a pageant in Washington D.C. and from doing charity work at an orphanage in Thailand to an appearance at the Grand Prix in Singapore. And in between she did her model castings in Amsterdam, Milan and Munich.

Study 
In September 2012 she decided that she wanted to go back to University. After receiving her bachelor's degree in Psychology and Neuroscience in the summer of 2011 and a sabbatical year of full-time Miss Netherlands activities and modeling she wanted to obtain her master's degree in Clinical and Health psychology. With only a half year internship left to complete, Kelly was a Master in Clinical and Health psychology in March 2014.

In the press 
 Kelly Weekers in de studio bij Dutch TV
 Kelly Weekers Dutch TV program Mag ik u kussen?

References

External links 
 
 Website Miss Nederland

1989 births
Living people
Dutch female models
Miss Universe 2011 contestants
People from Weert
Dutch beauty pageant winners
Maastricht University alumni